Desbruyeresia marisindica is a species of sea snail, a marine gastropod mollusk in the family Provannidae.

The specific name marisindica is from the Latin language word mare that means "sea" and from the Latin word indica that means "Indian" referring to the Indian ocean, where the species lives.

Distribution

The type locality is the Kairei hydrothermal vent site on the Central Indian Ridge, just north of the Rodrigues Triple Point.

Description

References

 Desbruyères, D., M. Segonzac & M. Bright (eds.). 2006. Handbook of Deep-sea Hydrothermal Vent Fauna. Second Edition Denisia 18: 1–544. (Copepods 316-355)(Polychaeta 183-296)

marisindica
Gastropods described in 2004